Megan Elizbeth Reid (born July 9, 1996) is an American professional soccer player who plays as a defender in the National Women's Soccer League (NWSL) for Angel City FC.

Early life
Reid was born in Orinda, California, where she attended Miramonte High School and played club soccer for Lamorinda SC. She has a sister, Katie, and a brother, Danny.

College career

Reid attended the University of Virginia, where she made 83 appearances and scored two goals. Her senior year, she started all 21 games, scored a golden goal at No. 2 West Virginia, and had two game-winning assists. Also in her senior year, she was named to the All-ACC second team and the ACC Women's Soccer All-Academic team.

Professional career

After losing her father, David, in her senior year of college, Reid declined to participate in the 2018 NWSL College Draft. Having talked about becoming a firefighter with her father before his passing, she decided to start volunteering at a local fire department in Virginia. She then moved back to the Bay Area to pursue a career as an emergency medical technician. While interning as a paramedic, Reid and her coworkers often played pickup soccer inside the fire station, and she rediscovered her love for the sport.

Reid rejoined her old club team, Lamorinda SC, which had just entered the semipro WPSL, and played seven of the team's eight games. From there, the Lamorinda staff and her college coach, Steve Swanson, began looking for professional playing opportunities, and she landed a training spot with FC Thy-Thisted Q in the Danish Kvindaeligaen. After San Diego Wave FC placed her on their discovery list, she joined their preseason training camp, but did not make the roster. She then joined Angel City for their preseason on an invitation from Head Coach Freya Coombe and earned a professional contract.

Reid played every minute of Angel City's inaugural season.

Honors

College 
All-ACC Second Team: 2017 
ACC All-Academic Team: 2017

References

External links
 
 

1996 births
Living people
American women's soccer players
Soccer players from California
Women's association football defenders
Virginia Cavaliers women's soccer players
Angel City FC players
National Women's Soccer League players